Murungu is an administrative Council in Muhambwe Constituency in Kibondo District of Kigoma Region in Tanzania. In 2016 the Tanzania National Bureau of Statistics report there were 8,077 people in the ward, from 7,338 in 2012.

Villages / neighborhoods 
The ward has 2 villages and 20 hamlets.

 Kumhasha
 Chigazule
 Ibehelo
 Katazi
 Kumhasha
 Kwisenga
 Mbugani
 Migombani
 Nduta
 Nyamata
 Rukangalizo
 Kumbanga
 Kabhadalala
 Kabogi
 Katobhanzovu
 Kayezi
 Kumana
 Kumbanga
 Kumgera
 Kwibhiliga
 Nyambega
 Rumambo

References

Kibondo District
Wards of Kigoma Region
Constituencies of Tanzania